Gemiliano "Mel" Campos Lopez Jr. (September 1, 1935 – January 1, 2017) was a Filipino politician who served as the 20th and 22nd Mayor of Manila from 1986 to 1987 and 1988 to 1992 and an assemblyman of the Batasang Pambansa of the Philippines from 1984 to 1986. He was also a former chairman of the Philippine Sports Commission.

Early life and education
Mel Lopez was born in Manila on September 1, 1935 to Carmen Campos of Bulacan and Lt. Col. Gemiliano López Sr. of Manila.  He is also the grandson of Honorio Lopez, writer and revolutionary during the Spanish Revolution. 

He graduated from the Jose Rizal University (formerly Jose Rizal College) with a degree in Bachelor of Science in Commercial Science. He also played swimming, boxing and basketball in the NCAA for the JRU Heavy Bombers.

Personal life
He was married to Concepcion Tantoco, a Filipina businesswoman and entrepreneur. They were married for over fifty years and have nine children, over thirty grandchildren, and two great-grandchildren.

Political life

Councilor (1967–1975) 

On August 21, 1971, 1971 Plaza Miranda bombing marred a Liberal Party rally, killing 9 persons and injuring 92 more, including Lopez, who was then a councilor. President Ferdinand Marcos used the bombing incident as a basis to suspend the writ of habeas corpus.

When Marcos declared martial law, Lopez decided to organize active opposition to the regime that could eventually topple it and help restore democracy to the country.  He held secret meetings with labor and student leaders, community and political leaders, exploring ideas on how to organize opposition to the martial law regime.

Laban
Lopez was among the founding signatories of Laban, a contraction of “Lakas ng Bayan” and a Tagalog translation of People's Power.  When Marcos announced an election for the Interim Batasang Pambansa on April 7, 1978, he was the campaign manager in Manila, organizing sorties and meetings to attract more citizens to oppose Marcos' dictatorial rule.

Batasang Pambansa (1984–1986) 
In recognition of his leadership in Manila, some 20 prospective candidates of United Nationalists Democratic Organizations (UNIDO) for the 1984 Batasang Pambansa elections signed a resolution giving him authority to select the five other candidates for the six assembly seats assigned to Manila based on voting population.

Marcos' ticket, the Kilusang Bagong Lipunan, suffered a heavy blow and the UNIDO candidates including Lopez and four others won. While serving in the Batasang Pambansa, he filed bills aimed at proposing the compensation income of spouses who are both employees to be taxed separately, paying lower taxes, seeking to abolish the Metro Manila Commission, providing for the establishment of the Philippine National Language Commission, and providing for a synchronization of national and local elections in 1986.

Mayor of Manila (1986–1992) 
After the People Power Revolution, Lopez was appointed as Mayor of Manila. During his early years, his administration was faced with 700 million pesos worth of debt and inherited an empty treasury. In the first eleven months, however, the debt was reduced to 365 million pesos and the city's income rose by around 70%. Revenues from movie theaters rose by 180%, from public markets 170%, and the Manila Zoo began to have profits. Manila had an annual income of over 700 million pesos due to these increase in tax revenues. Within the same eleven months, 21 schools were built. Squatters were relocated, with an average of 12,700 families a year.

During the 1988 elections, he ran for a full term under the PDP-LABAN and won, defeating Former Assemblyman Lito Atienza and Former Senator Eva Estrada-Kalaw.

Lopez closed down numerous illegal gambling joints and jueteng. He also blocked the re-opening of jai-alai, the “game of the thousand thrills,” despite pressure from powerful groups.

In January 1990, Lopez padlocked two Manila casinos operated by the Philippine Amusement and Gaming Corporation (PAGCOR), saying the billions it gained cannot make up for the negative effects gambling inflicts upon the people, particularly the youth. As a result of this, he was charged with graft in the Sandiganbayan in the same year. The case remained unresolved until it was finally dropped in June 2002.

He also worked for the revival of the Boys’ Town Haven (now referred to as “Boys Town”), rehabilitating its facilities to accommodate underprivileged children and provide them with livelihood and education.

During the 1992 elections, he lost reelection to former National Bureau of Investigation director Alfredo Lim.

Post-mayoralty (1992–2017) 
In 1993, he was appointed by President Fidel Ramos as Chairman of the Philippine Sports Commission, serving until 1996. During his term as PSC Chairman, he helped Onyok Velasco to captured the silver medal in the 1996 Summer Olympics in Atlanta, USA, together with his son Manny Lopez, then-president of the Amateur Boxing Association of the Philippines (renamed as Association of Boxing Alliances in the Philippines or ABAP), now a congressman representing Manila's 1st congressional district.

In 1995, he sought a rematch against Lim but was unsuccessful. Nine years later, in 2004, he ran again for mayor against then incumbent Lito Atienza under the Koalisyon ng Nagkakaisang Pilipino (KNP) but lost.

Lopez died on New Year's Day, January 1, 2017, in Quezon City from a heart attack at the age of 81 and three months.

In April 2019, President Rodrigo Duterte signed Republic Act No. 11280 to officially rename a portion of Radial Road 10 to Mel Lopez Boulevard, which runs from Anda Circle in Manila up north to Estero de Marala at the city's border with Navotas.

References

1935 births
2017 deaths
Mayors of Manila
Laban ng Demokratikong Pilipino politicians
Liberal Party (Philippines) politicians
Members of the House of Representatives of the Philippines from Manila
Chairpersons of the Philippine Sports Commission
Manila City Council members
Ramos administration personnel
José Rizal University alumni
Burials at The Heritage Park
Members of the Batasang Pambansa